Loxostege sedakowialis is a moth in the family Crambidae. It was described by Eduard Friedrich Eversmann in 1852. It is found in Russia and Afghanistan.

References

Moths described in 1852
Pyraustinae